Manolis Kanellopoulos (12 January 1938 – 10 September 2017) was a Greek professional footballer who played as a defender and a later manager.

Club career
Kanellopoulos started playing football at a young age and soon joined the infrastructure departments of his local club, Egaleo. He became a key member of the youth team of the club and in 1956 at the age of 18 he competed for the first time with the men's team in the first division of the AFCA league. He established himself as the main players in the defence of the club for the following 6 seasons, winning two consecutive local championships and playing in the newly established second national division, helping his team to get the promotion to the first national division in 1961. The following season, his tall and athletic body structure combined with his remarkable technical qualities and strong legs that allowed him to unleash medicinal straight shots as he covered the position of the right wing-back with particular success did not go unnoticed by the big clubs that met him as an opponent. The desire of the president of AEK Athens, Nikos Goumas in signing Kanellopoulos proved to be the most effective of all and thus the defender from Aigaleo was transferred to AEK in the summer of 1962.

With the yellow-blacks, he played for three seasons being mostly one of their main defenders. He even made it in to the qualifying phase of the European Cup playing in both matches against Monaco. During his spell in the club he won a championship title in 1963 and a Greek Cup in 1964. A serious injury in 1964 prevented him from being more involved in his last season and eventually forced him to leave the club in the summer of 1965, returning to Egaleo.

He played with the club of Aigaleo for two more seasons in the first division before leaving in the summer of 1967. He played a season in the second division with the shirt of Atromitos, where he finished his career in 1969.

After football
After the end of his career as a football player Kanellopoulos was involved in coaching, working as a coach in various small provincial clubs until 1980, when he stopped his involvement in football. He also participated in some events of the Veterans Association of AEK Athens.

Personal life
Kanellopoulos lived permanently in Aigaleo, was married and had two sons. He died on 10 September 2017 at the age of 79.

Honours

Egaleo
AFCA league: 1959–60, 1960–61

AEK Athens
Alpha Ethniki: 1962–63
Greek Cup: 1963–64

References

1938 births
2017 deaths
Egaleo F.C. players
AEK Athens F.C. players
Atromitos F.C. players
Footballers from Athens
Greek footballers
Association football defenders